Goforth is a ghost town in Hays County, Texas, United States.

History
The community was named for a businessman J. T. Goforth who owned land and was a merchant. Cotton was the main business. From 1890 to 1902, there  was a post office. There was a school which closed in 1948.

Notes

Geography of Hays County, Texas
Ghost towns in Texas